Ada, the National College for Digital Skills. (Ada College) is a small college for further education in London, England, with campuses in Tottenham Hale and Whitechapel. It is named after Ada Lovelace and opened in September 2016. Its curriculum is designed with input from founding industry partners such as Bank of America Merrill Lynch, Gamesys, IBM, Deloitte, and King. Their founding education partner is the Aldridge Foundation. The Board is chaired by Tiffany Hall and Martha Lane Fox is Ada's Patron.

History 
The Prime Minister announced the formation of Ada, the National College for Digital Skills, in 2014 in a move to open five new National Colleges in crucial industries. The National Colleges have a mission to work designing the curriculum with employers “to produce the skills needed now and into the future to ensure the UK remains innovative and at the forefront of pioneering industry.”

Ada was founded by Mark Smith and Tom Fogden, both of the inaugural Teach First cohort which aims to get talented teachers into classrooms in low income areas. Previously Smith assisted Lord Adonis writing his book Education, Education, Education.

Bank of America Merrill Lynch, Gamesys, Deloitte Digital, IBM, King and the Aldridge Foundation are the colleges founding partners. Capital Funding is supplied by BEIS, the GLA and Haringey Council.

Ada opened to its first cohort of students in 2016 and became the first brand new further education college in England since 1993. Ada opened its second campus in Whitechapel, London in March 2019.

By 2028 Ada will have educated 10,000 young people nationwide.  There will be an ongoing cohort of 1,500 per annum in London and plans in place for a campus outside London.

Provision 
The College opened its ‘Hub’ campus in Tottenham Hale in September 2016. Ada's sixth form first took students in September 2016. Each Ada student studies Computer Science as well as a range of A-levels. Ada's higher and degree level apprenticeship programmes began in 2017. Ada currently offers pathways in Software Development, Data Analytics and Tech Consultancy with over 30 blue chip employers such as Salesforce, Google, Sainsbury's, Deloitte, EY and many more. A degree programme, validated by the Open University, sits at the core of Ada's programmes.

References 

2016 establishments in England
Educational institutions established in 2016
Further education colleges in London
2016 in London
Education in the London Borough of Haringey
Education in the London Borough of Tower Hamlets